Mount Pleasant is an area of Virgin Islands National Park on the island of Saint John in the United States Virgin Islands. It is located between Maho Bay and Centerline Road. This area is uninhabited and its name has fallen out of use.

References

Saint John, U.S. Virgin Islands